Eupithecia albifurva is a moth in the  family Geometridae. It is found in Sri Lanka.

References

Moths described in 1907
albifurva
Moths of Asia